Antonio del Castillo y Saavedra (10 July 1616 – 2 February 1668) was a Spanish Baroque painter, sculptor, and poet.

Biography 
Antonio del Castillo y Saavedra was born at Córdoba, Spain.

He trained in painting under his father Agustín del Castillo, and after his death by a little-known religious painter named Ignacio Aedo Calderón from 1631 to 1634. Later he was taught in Seville by Francisco de Zurbarán and by his uncle Juan del Castillo, who was also teacher of Cano, Murillo and De Moya. In 1635 he returned to Córdoba, where he painted frescoes and oil paintings (such as those in the church of Santa Marina).

He died at Córdoba in 1668.

References 

1616 births
1668 deaths
People from Córdoba, Spain
Spanish Baroque painters
Spanish Baroque sculptors
Baroque writers
Spanish male sculptors